The ninth season of Alarm für Cobra 11 – Die Autobahnpolizei aired between September 11, 2003 and May 13, 2004.

Format
Christian Oliver joins the cast. Niels Kurvin joins the recurring cast as Hartmut Freund. Erdoğan Atalay became the leading actor from this season.

Cast

Main
 Erdoğan Atalay - Semir Gerkhan
 Christian Oliver - Jan Richter

Recurring
 Niels Kurvin - Hartmud Freund (Episodes 1, 17-18)

Episodes

2003 German television seasons
2004 German television seasons